Matt Kelchner (born March 5, 1959) is a retired American football coach. He served as the head football coach at Christopher Newport University in Newport News, Virginia from 2001 to 2016. Kelchner was hired as Christopher Newport's first head coach on May 9, 2000. Over 16 seasons at Christopher Newport, Kelchner compiled an overall record of 109–61, guided his team to the NCAA Division III playoffs ten times and was named USA South Athletic Conference Coach of the Year seven times. Under Kelcher's direction, CNU was nationally ranked four times in his 16 seasons and lost 10 of their 13 NCAA Division III playoff games.

After missing the NCAA playoffs three times in four seasons and not matching his earlier success in the more competitive New Jersey Athletic Conference, Kelchner retired after the 2016 season as the longest-reigning head coach of the Christopher Newport program at the age of 57, and moved into an administration role in the university's athletic department. He was an assistant coach at The College of William & Mary from 1984 to 2000.

Head coaching record

References

External links
 Christopher Newport profile

1959 births
Living people
Christopher Newport Captains football coaches
Dickinson Red Devils football coaches
Mansfield Mounties football coaches
William & Mary Tribe football coaches
Susquehanna University alumni
Sportspeople from Harrisburg, Pennsylvania